
Gmina Zławieś Wielka is a rural gmina (administrative district) in Toruń County, Kuyavian-Pomeranian Voivodeship, in north-central Poland.

Villages
Gmina Zławieś Wielka contains the villages and settlements of Błotka, Borek, Cegielnik, Cichoradz, Czarne Błoto, Czarnowo, Doły Łążyńskie, Gierkowo, Górsk, Gutowo, Gutowo-Leśnictwo, Kamieniec, Łążyn, Łążynek, Pędzewo, Przysiek, Rozgarty, Rzęczkowo, Siemoń, Skłudzewo, Smolno, Stanisławka, Stary Toruń, Szerokie, Toporzysko, Zarośle Cienkie, Zławieś Mała and Zławieś Wielka.

Neighbouring gminas
Gmina Zławieś Wielka is bordered by the towns of Bydgoszcz and Toruń, and by the gminas of Dąbrowa Chełmińska, Łubianka, Łysomice, Solec Kujawski, Unisław and Wielka Nieszawka.

References
Polish official population figures 2006

Zlawies Wielka
Toruń County